Ryaverket is a regional sewage treatment plant in Gothenburg, Sweden. The plant is located in southern Hisingen and treats wastewater from 797,485 people in the Gothenburg region (2020).

The facility is owned by Gryaab, a municipal company owned by the municipalities whose wastewater is treated at Ryaverket. The owner municipalities are Gothenburg, Ale, Härryda, Mölndal, Kungälv,  Partille, Bollebygd  and Lerum.

Ryaverket is the home of the world's longest mural, on 696 square meters, by Pontus Andersson.

See also
Rya skog

References

Gothenburg
Sewage treatment plants
Hisingen
Murals